Tom Holland (born 1996) is an English actor.

Tom Holland may also refer to:
Tom Holland (Australian footballer) (1885–1946), Australian footballer
Tom Holland (footballer, born 1902) (1902–1987), English footballer
Tom Holland (artist) (born 1936), American visual artist
Tom Holland (filmmaker) (born 1943), American film director
Tom Holland (politician) (born 1961), Kansas state senator
Tom Holland (author) (born 1968), English author
Tom Holland (footballer, born 1997), English footballer

See also
Thomas Holland (disambiguation)
Tom Hollander (born 1967), English actor
Thom Haaland (born 1967), Norwegian sailor